The 2018 season is Bangkok Glass Football Club's 10th existence in the new era since they took over from Krung Thai Bank Football Club in 2009. It is the 3rd season in the Thai League and club's 10th consecutive season in the top flight of the Thai football league system since took over in the 2009 season.

League by seasons

Competitions

Thai League

Thai FA Cup

Thai League Cup

References

External links
 Thai League official website
 Club's official website
 Club's official Facebook page
 Club's info from Thai League official website

BG Pathum United F.C. seasons
Association football in Thailand lists
BKG